Ravana Falls is a popular sightseeing attraction in Sri Lanka. It currently ranks as one of the widest falls in the country.

Description 
During the local wet season, the waterfall turns into what is said to resemble an areca flower with withering petals. But this is not the case in the dry season, where the flow of water reduces dramatically.

Legend
The falls have been named after the legendary king Ravana, who is connected to the famous Indian epic, the Ramayana. According to legend, it is said that Ravana (who was the king of Lanka at the time) had kidnapped princess Sita, and had hidden her in the caves behind this waterfall, now simply known as the Ravana Ella Cave. The reason for the kidnapping is said to be exact revenge for slicing off the nose of his sister by Rama (husband of Sita) and his brother Laxmana. At the time, the cave was surrounded by thick forests in the midst of the wilderness. It is also believed that Rama's queen bathed in a pool that accumulated the water falling from this waterfall. They believed that Ravana has played the Ravanahatha over here.

Ravana Ella cave 

Excavations undertaken in the cave uncovered evidence of human habitation dating back to 25,000 years.

See also 
 List of waterfalls in Sri Lanka

References

External links 

Landforms of Badulla District
Waterfalls in Uva Province
Places in the Ramayana